Killers of the Cosmos is a documentary science television series hosted by Aiden Gillen. Aired by the Science Channel, it premiered on September 19, 2021.

Format
In a format the Science Channel describes as "space noir," Killers of the Cosmos explores possible lethal threats the cosmos poses to life on Earth through the "investigations" of a private investigator — the "Gumshoe Detective," modeled in the style of a character in a Raymond Chandler novel — portrayed by Aidan Gillen in animated form. In scripted dramatic sequences combining the characteristics of film noir with those of a pulp fiction graphic novel set in the mid-20th century, the Gumshoe Detective hosts each episode. Aided by a mysterious informant portrayed by Sarah Winter, the detective takes on a "case" and hunts down a "killer" by exploring a lethal threat the cosmos poses to humanity. The animated sequences link conventional live-action documentary segments in which experts in astronomy, astrophysics, cosmology, planetary science,  biology, and aerospace engineering describe and explain phenomena that could threaten the Earth, how they pose a threat, what would happen on Earth if they actually took place, the likelihood of them occurring, and how to counter them.

Production
Wall to Wall Media produced Killers of the Cosmos. The executive producers for Wall to Wall Media were Tim Lambert and Jeremy Dear and for Discovery, Inc., were Caroline Perez, Abram Sitzer and Wyatt Channell. The series producer was Nigel Paterson. Ben Scott directed the episodes.

Episode list
SOURCES

See also
Alien Planet
Cosmos: A Spacetime Odyssey
Extreme Universe
How the Universe Works
Into the Universe with Stephen Hawking
The Planets and Beyond
Space's Deepest Secrets
Strip the Cosmos
Through the Wormhole
The Universe

References

External links

tvmaze.com Killers of the Cosmos – Episode Guide
Discovery UK Killers of the Cosmos promotional video on YouTube

2021 American television series debuts
2020s American documentary television series
American television series with live action and animation
Documentary television series about astronomy
Science Channel original programming
Television series by Warner Bros. Television Studios